The Winston-Salem Open is a men's professional tennis tournament played on the ATP Tour at Wake Forest University in Winston-Salem, North Carolina in the United States. It made its debut at Winston-Salem in 2011 and is part of the 250 tier of events. The tournament was previously staged in Long Island and New Haven before it was sold and relocated to Winston-Salem, creating a new tournament.

The Winston-Salem Open was awarded the 2016 ATP Tour 250 Tournament of the Year.

History
The event started on Long Island's Jericho hamlet as a four-player singles exhibition in 1981, the event, first known as the Hamlet Challenge Cup, developed into a larger draw competition, and saw winning numerous top players in the 1980s, including Ivan Lendl and an eighteen-year-old Andre Agassi in 1988. In 1990, the Long Island tournament became part of the tour as it entered the newly created Association of Tennis Professionals (ATP) Tour, being sponsored by numerous companies including; Norstar Bank in 1990 and 1991, Waldbaum's from 1992 to 1995 and from 1997 to 2000, Genovese Drug Stores in 1996, and TD Waterhouse from 2002 until the move to New Haven, adding names like Stefan Edberg, Yevgeny Kafelnikov, Magnus Norman, Paradorn Srichaphan and Lleyton Hewitt to its list of champions.

In 2005 the USTA decided to purchase the men's tournament of Long Island, New York and merge it with the Women's event at New Haven. This move created the first large joint ATP–WTA tournament leading to the US Open. The tournament remained a joint event until 2011 when the men's and women's events became separated, and the men's tournament relocated to Winston-Salem. The tournament will ignore its history with the ATP calling it a new event.

Tournament
The tournament is part of the US Open Series and is typically held in August the week prior to the US Open. It is one of six 250 level events on tour played in the United States. In 2016, the tournament received recognition as one of the ATP World Tour 250 Tournaments of the Year.

Ivan Lendl holds the record for most singles titles at five, winning in 1984–1986, 1989 and 1991; he also holds the record for most singles titles won in a row, at three. The only doubles team to win back-to-back titles is Jonathan Stark and Kevin Ullyett.

Past finals

Singles

Doubles

References

External links
 Official website
 ATP tournament profile

 
Tennis in North Carolina
Hard court tennis tournaments in the United States
ATP Tour